The Kamchatka meteor was a meteor that exploded in an air burst off the east coast of the Kamchatka Peninsula in eastern Russia on 18 December 2018.

Overview

Based on the energy and velocity of the impact, the asteroid had a mass of 1600 tonnes and a diameter of between 10 and 14 meters (32 to 45 feet) depending on its density. The impact was announced around 8 March 2019, and is the largest asteroid to impact Earth since the 20-meter Chelyabinsk meteor's entry in February 2013, and the third largest recorded meteor since 1900 after that and the Tunguska event.

NASA's Terra satellite and the Japanese Meteorological Agency's Himawari 8 recorded the dust trail from the event, although their observation interval was too long to image the air burst itself.

The dominant period of the CTBTO infrasound was very long, on the order of 20 to 25 seconds, corresponding to energy on the order of 100 to 200 kilotons. The shockwave was strong enough to have cracked windows had the shockwave been over a built-up region.

Even though it was only six years after the previous one, events as large as this are statistically estimated to occur only once every few decades on average.

As of January 2017, over 723,000 asteroids were being tracked in the Solar System, with more discovered, lost and recovered daily. Since 2011, on average, 80 new minor planets of diameter 30–50 meters or more are discovered each day. As of March 2019, 724 (roughly one in a thousand) are classified as potentially hazardous asteroids (PHA). Neither the Chelyabinsk nor the Kamchatka meteors were on the list and would have been too small to detect with current resources.

References
 

Modern Earth impact events
Meteoroids
2018 in space
2019 in science
History of the Kamchatka Peninsula
December 2018 events in Russia